Gebsattel is a municipality in the district of Ansbach in Bavaria in Germany. It lies on the Tauber River.

Main sights

Neighborhoods, districts 
Gebsattel has nine neighborhoods or districts:
 Bockenfeld
 Eckartshof
 Gebsattel
 Kirnberg
 Pleikartshof
 Rödersdorf
 Speierhof
 Wasenmühle
 Wildenhof

References

External links 

 Map of the municipality
 
 

Ansbach (district)